Kang Duk-soo (born 18 August 1950 in Seonsan, Gyeongsangbuk-do, South Korea) is a Korean businessman. He currently serves as the chairman of STX Group, a South Korean conglomerate company (Chaebol), formerly known as SsangYong Heavy Industries.

In 2014, Kang was sentenced for 6 years in prison for fraud, and in 2015, a court ruled that he was not guilty of accounting fraud.

Education
Myongji University, Bachelor of Business Administration (1974)
Seoul National University, GLP (Global Leadership Program)
Changwon National University, Honorary Doctor of Business Administration (2006)

Career
1973–95, Ssangyong Heavy Industries
1997–2000, Executive Vice President and CFO, Ssangyong Heavy Industries
2000–01, President and CEO, Ssangyong Heavy Industries
2001–03, President and CEO, STX Corporation, STX Pan Ocean, STX Offshore & Shipbuilding, STX Engine, STX Energy
2003–present, Chairman, STX Group

Awards
Silver Tower Order of Industrial Service Merit (Republic of Korea, 2003)
Grand Prize of Global CEO (Japan Management Association Consulting, 2003)
Best CEO of the Year 2005 Award (Changwon City, 2005)
Grand Prize for the 1st Korea Ocean Award (Marine Industry and Technology Organization, 2007)
Honorary Citizen of Dalian City (Dalian City, China, 2008)
Personality of the Year in Seatrade Asia Awards 2008 (Seatrade, 2008)
Shipbuilding Entrepreneur of the Year in Ernst & Young Entrepreneur of the Year Awards (Ernst & Young, 2009)
CEO of the Year 2009 Award (Korea Management Association, 2009)
Dasan Management Award (Korea Economic Daily, 2009)

See also
Economy of South Korea
STX Europe ASA

References

External links
STX Corporation

1950 births
Living people
People from Gumi, North Gyeongsang
People from North Gyeongsang Province
South Korean businesspeople
South Korean chairpersons of corporations
Recipients of the Order of Industrial Service Merit
South Korean fraudsters
Myongji University alumni
Seoul National University alumni
20th-century South Korean businesspeople
21st-century South Korean businesspeople